The 2014 European Women's Handball Championship was the eleventh continental tournament for women's national teams, organized by the European Handball Federation. The second jointly hosted edition in the competition's history took place in Hungary and Croatia from 7 to 21 December 2014.

Norway won their sixth title after beating Spain 28–25 in the final. Sweden defeated Montenegro 25–23 to capture the bronze medal.

Norway's victory ensured their qualification for the 2016 Summer Olympics. However, they later won the 2015 World Women's Handball Championship, vacating the European champion Olympic berth which fell to Spain as the runner-up. The two next-best placed teams, Sweden and Montenegro, earned spots in the Olympic Qualification Tournaments.

Host selection
Initially there were two applicants for the tournament, Slovenia and Turkey, with none of them having the experience of organizing a continental event before. However, both candidates withdrew their offers later, thus the host nation could not be selected on the 10th Ordinary EHF Congress between 24 and 25 September 2010 as it was planned.

Instead, the European Handball Federation re-launched the bidding process. As a result, six federations (Croatia, Hungary, Iceland, Slovakia, Sweden and Turkey) showed intention to host the championship. Until the final deadline of 28 January 2011, EHF received three bids from four federations:

  /  (joint bid)
 
 

After a thorough analysis, Slovakia was excluded from the race first, as they failed to ensure a minimum of four arenas that meet the strict criteria for the European Championship. The EHF Executive Committee decided between the two remaining aspirants on its meeting on 9 April 2011, awarding the right to host the 11th Women's EHF European Handball Championship to Hungary and Croatia.

Venues

Qualification

Qualified teams

1 Bold indicates champion for that year.

Seeding
The draw was held on 19 June 2014 at 13:00 local time in Zagreb, Croatia.

Squads

Referees
12 referee pairs were selected:

Preliminary round
The playing schedule was released on 4 June 2014.

All times are local (UTC+1).

Group A

Group B

Group C

Group D

Main round
All times are local (UTC+1).

Group I

Group II

Knockout stage

Bracket

All times are local (UTC+1).

Semifinals

Fifth place game

Third place game

Final

Final ranking

{| class="wikitable" 
!width=40|Rank
!width=180|Team
|-bgcolor=#dfefff
|align=center||| 
|-bgcolor=#ccffcc
|align=center||| 
|-bgcolor=#ccccff
|align=center||| 
|-bgcolor=#ccccff
|align=center|4|| 
|-
|align=center|5|| 
|-
|align=center|6|| 
|-
|align=center|7|| 
|-
|align=center|8|| 
|-
|align=center|9|| 
|-
|align=center|10|| 
|-
|align=center|11|| 
|-
|align=center|12|| 
|-
|align=center|13|| 
|-
|align=center|14|| 
|-
|align=center|15|| 
|-
|align=center|16|| 
|}

Note: As Norway later qualified for the olympics as World Champions, the qualification slot went to the runner up instead and Montenegro qualified for the qualification tournament instead of Spain.

Awards
The all-star team and awards were announced on 21 December 2014.

All-Star Team
Goalkeeper: 
Right wing: 
Right back: 
Centre back: 
Left back: 
Left wing: 
Pivot:

Other awards
Most Valuable Player: 
Best Defensive Player:

Statistics

Top goalscorers

Source: SportResult.com

Top goalkeepers

Source: SportResult.com

References

External links

Eurohandball.com 

 
2014
European Women's Handball Championship
European Women's Handball Championship
European Women's Handball Championship
2014 European Women's Handball Championship
2014 European Women's Handball Championship
Women's handball in Hungary
Women's handball in Croatia
December 2014 sports events in Europe
International sports competitions in Budapest
2010s in Budapest
Sport in Győr
Sport in Debrecen
Sport in Osijek
Sport in Varaždin
Sports competitions in Zagreb
2010s in Zagreb